The Brazil women's national rugby league team represent Brazil in international rugby league football competitions. They were announced to play in the 2021 Women's Rugby League World Cup in July 2019. Former Super League player Matt Gardner, of Brazilian descent, was announced as head coach in November 2019. However, due to Covid restrictions and personal circumstance, Gardner was unable to fulfil his duties as head coach and was replaced by Paul Grundy in November 2020.

Current squad 
The following squad was announced on 10 October 2022 for the postponed 2021 Women's Rugby League World Cup in November 2022. 
Table last updated 10 November 2022, following the Round 3 match against Canada.

Notes:
 Just two members of the World Cup squad had played against Argentina in 2018. They are Maria Graf and Tatiane (Tati) Fernandes.
 All members of the squad participated in a warm-up match against France on 27 October 2022, with Franciny Amaral scoring the Brazil's only try.

Results

Full Internationals

Unofficial Matches 

Note:
 The above match against France is not considered a full international as more than 17 players took the field.

References

Women's national rugby league teams
R